Dennis Village Cemetery, also known as the Common Burying Ground and  East Yarmouth Churchyard, is a historic cemetery at Massachusetts Route 6A and Old Bass River Road in the center of Dennis, Massachusetts.  The oldest portion, a  parcel, has grave markers dating to 1728, and may contain even older burials.  It was established when Dennis was still part of neighboring Yarmouth.  Among its notable burials are those of Rev. Josiah Dennis, the namesake of the town, and his wife.

The cemetery was listed on the National Register of Historic Places in 2005.

See also
 National Register of Historic Places listings in Barnstable County, Massachusetts

References

External links
 
 

Cemeteries on the National Register of Historic Places in Massachusetts
Cemeteries in Barnstable County, Massachusetts
Dennis, Massachusetts
National Register of Historic Places in Barnstable County, Massachusetts
Cemeteries established in the 18th century